John Joseph Bullman (c.1870 – March 6, 1922) was an American Thoroughbred horse racing jockey who competed at racetracks across the United States.

Riding at tracks on the American East Coast, in 1900 Bullman won the Matron Stakes at Morris Park Racecourse in The Bronx, New York then later that year won the American Derby at Washington Park Race Track in Chicago before going west in the late fall to compete at Tanforan Racetrack in San Bruno, California near San Francisco.

In 1901 Bullman won his second straight American Derby then in 1902 won the first of two consecutive editions of the Belmont Stakes at Morris Park Racecourse. Records show he continued to race on the West Coast during the winter months and in 1907 was in Los Angeles, California. Bullman was the first jockey to win purses totaling one million dollars in one season. One day he won all eight races.

Family
In 1900, Bullman married Mary Agnes Herbert of San Francisco. The couple had three sons, John Jr. (Jack), Spencer, and Herbert (Buddy), plus a daughter, Mary Esther.  His sons were jockeys. Spencer was most successful but was seriously injured during a race which ended his career. His youngest son Herbert (Buddy/Beau) Bullman served decades in the United States Navy achieving the Rank of Chief Petty Officer. He survived the Japanese attack on Pearl Harbor and later numerous airborne missions in the Pacific Theatre and the South-East Asian theatre of World War II.

Passing
Bullman died from tuberculosis in Saranac Lake, New York in 1922 at age 52 after a lengthy illness. He was interred in the Holy Cross Cemetery in Brooklyn, New York.

References

 
 Newspaper clip and transcript from the November 19, 1900 The San Francisco Call referring to John Bullman
 September 29, 1900 New York Times article titled Bullman Will Ride Again

1870 births
1922 deaths
American jockeys
20th-century deaths from tuberculosis
Irish emigrants to the United States (before 1923)
Burials at Holy Cross Cemetery, Brooklyn
Tuberculosis deaths in New York (state)